Diego Soldano, (born January 18, 1969) is an Argentine actor. Better known for his notable roles in the telenovelas, La Patrona, Las trampas del deseo, Los miserables and Señora Acero.

Personal life 
Soldano is married to Ibana Lizárraga, with whom he has three children.

Filmography

Awards and nominations

References

External links 

1969 births
Argentine male telenovela actors
Living people
21st-century Argentine male actors
Male actors from Buenos Aires